B50 or B-50 may refer to:
 B-50 Superfortress, an airplane
 BSA B50, 500cc motorcycle
 International Statistical Classification of Diseases and Related Health Problems (ICD-10), code for Plasmodium falciparum malaria
 Leyland Royal Tiger, a UK bus
 Sicilian Defence, an Encyclopaedia of Chess Openings code
 A Vietnamese RPG-2 rocket-propelled grenade launcher
 B-50, alias of Gap-43 protein
 HLA-B50, a HLA-B serotype